Bell Field, originally known as College Field (1893–1909), was an outdoor athletic stadium in the northwest United States, on the campus of Oregon State College (now University) in Corvallis, Oregon. It was the home venue of Oregon State Beavers football prior to the opening of Parker Stadium (now Reser Stadium) in November 1953. Track and field continued at Bell Field until its demolition in 1974.

History
Opened  in 1910, Bell Field had a seating capacity of 21,000 at its peak and was named after J.R.N. "Doc" Bell, an early supporter of the college and its athletic teams.

After Parker Stadium opened, most of the seating was removed, but it hosted the school's track and field program on a cinder track until March 1974, after which it was torn down. It was located directly west of the baseball field (today's Goss Stadium at Coleman Field) and parallel to its first base line. The Dixon Recreation Center, opened in 1976, occupies the site.

A natural grass field for football was first installed at Bell Field in 1937; the surface was previously a mixture of dirt and sawdust. That field surface was not unique in the Northwest in the Pacific Coast Conference (PCC): Hayward Field in Eugene, Multnomah Stadium in Portland, and Husky Stadium in Seattle made similar transitions to natural grass in this period of time.

In the early 1950s, Oregon State played most of its home football games in Portland at Multnomah Stadium. The final varsity game at Bell Field was the only game on campus in 1952, a 27–6 homecoming loss to conference foe Idaho on November 15, with an approximate attendance of 8,000. The Beavers' sole win in the PCC that season was the following week in the Civil War game in Portland. The only game in 1953 in Corvallis was the opener for Parker Stadium on November 14, a 7–0 win over Washington State.

Later tracks
A new all-weather track facility opened on the south end of campus in 1974, aligned northeast-southwest, and was named Wayne Valley Field the following year. OSU dropped its track programs (men & women) after the 1988 season, and the facility was removed in the 1990s, now occupied by the softball stadium and a gravel parking lot.

The women's team was reintroduced in fall 2004 and the new Whyte Track and Field Center opened in September 2012. Adjacent to the southeast and lighted for night use, its alignment is nearly east-west, angled slightly northeast. It is bounded by 15th Street on the east and Philomath Boulevard (US 20) on the south.

References

External links
 Oregon State University Libraries: Bell Field photos
 OSU Alumni Association: In memory of Bell Field

Defunct college football venues
Oregon State Beavers football venues
Demolished sports venues in Oregon
American football venues in Oregon
Athletics (track and field) venues in Oregon
1910 establishments in Oregon
Sports venues demolished in 1974
Sports venues completed in 1910
1974 disestablishments in Oregon